Matthew Green may refer to:

Matthew Green (British politician) (born 1970), British Liberal Democrat Member of Parliament for Ludlow
Matthew Green (Canadian politician) (born 1980) NDP Member of Parliament for Hamilton Centre and former Hamilton City Councillor
Matthew Green (football manager) (born 1972), English football coach in Turks and Caicos
Matthew Green (journalist) (born 1975), British journalist and author
Matthew Green (New Zealand politician) (1840–1914), New Zealand politician 
Matthew Green (poet) (1696–1737), British poet
Matthew Green (writer), shortlisted for 2022 Wainwright Prize
Matthew D. Green (born 1976), cryptographer and assistant professor at Johns Hopkins University
Matt Green (actor), English actor and comedian
Matt Green (cricketer) (born 1993), English cricketer
Matt Green (footballer) (born 1987), English footballer
Matt Green (musician) (born 1967), American keyboard player, songwriter and producer
Matthew Dicks (born 1971), American novelist and storyteller with the pseudonym Matthew Green

See also
Matt Greene (born 1983), American ice hockey defenceman
Matt Greene (politician), American politician